Shamushak-e Sofla (also Romanized as Shamūshak-e Soflá; also known as Shamūshak-e Pā’īn) is a village in Roshanabad Rural District, in the Central District of Gorgan County, Golestan Province, Iran. At the 2006 census, its population was 882, in 218 families.

References 

Populated places in Gorgan County